A radioisotope rocket or radioisotope thermal rocket is a type of thermal rocket engine that uses the heat generated by the decay of radioactive elements to heat a working fluid, which is then exhausted through a rocket nozzle to produce thrust. They are similar in nature to nuclear thermal rockets such as NERVA, but are considerably simpler and often have no moving parts. Alternatively, radioisotopes may be used in a radioisotope electric rocket, in which energy from nuclear decay is used to generate the electricity used to power an electric propulsion system.

The basic idea is a development of existing radioisotope thermoelectric generator, or RTG, systems, in which the heat generated by decaying nuclear fuel is used to generate power. In the rocket application the generator is removed, and the working fluid is instead used to produce thrust directly. Temperatures of about 1500 to 2000 °C are possible in this system, allowing for specific impulses of about 700 to 800 seconds (7 to 8 kN·s/kg), about double that of the best chemical engines such as the LH2-LOX Space Shuttle Main Engine.

However the amount of power generated by such systems is typically fairly low. Whereas the full "active" reactor system in a nuclear thermal rocket can be expected to generate over a gigawatt, a radioisotope generator might get 5 kW. This means that the design, while highly efficient, can produce thrust levels of perhaps 1.3 to 1.5 N, making them useful only for thrusters. In order to increase the power for medium-duration missions, engines would typically use fuels with a short half-life such as polonium-210, as opposed to the typical RTG which would use a long half-life fuel such as plutonium-238 in order to produce more constant power over longer periods of time.

Another drawback to the use of radioisotopes in rockets is an inability to change the operating power. The radioisotope constantly generates heat that must be safely dissipated when it is not heating a propellant. Reactors, on the other hand, can be throttled or shut down as desired.

Technology development

TRW maintained a fairly active development program known as Poodle from 1961 to 1965, and today the systems are still often known as Poodle thrusters. The name was a play on the larger systems being developed under Project Rover, which led to NERVA. In April 1965 they ran their testbed engine for 65 hours at about 1500 °C, producing a specific impulse of 650 to 700 seconds (6.5 to 7 kN·s/kg).

Photon pressure

Even without an exhaust, the photon pressure of the energy emitted by a thermal source can produce thrust, although an extremely tiny amount. A famous example of spacecraft thrust due to photon pressure was the Pioneer anomaly, in which photons from the onboard radioisotope source caused a tiny but measurable acceleration of the Pioneer spacecraft.

A similar phenomenon occurred on the New Horizons spacecraft; photons (thermal infrared) from the RTG, reflected from the spacecraft's antenna, produced a very small thrust which propelled the spacecraft slightly off course.

See also
Spacecraft propulsion
Thermal rocket
Nuclear thermal rocket
Radioisotope heater unit

References

External links
AIAA meeting paper study comparing Poodle thrusters to a chemical (hydrogen/fluorine) option for upper stage propulsion
United States Patent 3315471; Direct cycle radioisotope rocket engine; 1967; Lee, Dailey Charles, Verdes, Estates Palos
United States Patent 3306045; Radioisotope rocket; 1967; Buford Jr., William H. Thomas Jr., Arthur N

Nuclear spacecraft propulsion